This is a list of the mayors of Leuven.

French First Republic (1794 — 1804) 
Dyle department was created on 1 October 1795, when the Austrian Netherlands was officially annexed by the French Republic, with Leuven located on its territory.

First French Empire (1804 — 1815) 
During First French Empire, Leuven continued to be a part of Dyle department.

United Kingdom of the Netherlands (1815 — 1830) 
Dyle department was disestablished in 1815 and replaced with South Brabant (Zuid-Brabant) province. The South Brabant province was then renamed simply "The Province of Brabant" in 1830 and became the central province of Belgium.

Kingdom of Belgium (1830 — present day) 
In 1995 Province of Brabant was split into three parts, one of which was Flemish Brabant, where Leuven is now located.

Bibliography
 Gilbert Huybens, Leuvense burgemeesters geportretteerd, series « Memorabilia Lovaniensia » n° 3, Leuven : Peeters, 2016,

See also
 Timeline of Leuven
 House of Spoelberch

References

External links

Leuven
History of Leuven